The 1943 NC State Wolfpack football team was an American football team that represented North Carolina State University as a member of the Southern Conference (SoCon) during the 1943 college football season. In its seventh and final season under head coach Williams Newton, the team compiled a 3–6 record (0–4 against SoCon opponents) and was outscored by a total of 229 to 78.

Schedule

References

NC State
NC State Wolfpack football seasons
NC State Wolfpack football